Sainte-Anne-de-Beaupré is a town in La Côte-de-Beaupré Regional County Municipality, Quebec, Canada, along the Saint Lawrence River,  north-east of Quebec City. The population was 2,803 according to the Canada 2006 Census.  Major religious landmarks, the Basilica of Sainte-Anne-de-Beaupré and the Convent of the Redemptoristines, are located in the town. The basilica continues to attract pilgrims.

Sainte-Anne-de-Beaupré stands in a rolling agricultural country, with the foothills of the Laurentian Mountains in the background. The first church was built by sailors, seeking protection against shipwrecks off Ile-Oeuf on their way upriver to Quebec City. Saint Anne is the patron saint of sailors.

Demographics 

Population trend:
 Population in 2011: 2854 (2006 to 2011 population change: +1.8%)
 Population in 2006: 2803
 Population in 2001: 2752
 Population in 1996: 3023
 Population in 1991: 3146

Mother tongue:
 English as first language: 0%
 French as first language: 98.2%
 English and French as first language: 0%
 Other as first language: 1.8%

Attractions
The Basilica of Sainte-Anne-de-Beaupré is a major Roman Catholic place of pilgrimage. It has a copy of Michelangelo's statue, the Pietà (the original is in the St. Peter's Basilica in Rome). The basilica is known as a place of miracles. One of the builders of the original church, Louis Guimont, helped build the church despite having severe scoliosis and needing the aid of a crutch.  When the church was complete, he was able to walk independently.

Many subsequent visitors who have prayed at the church have left their canes, crutches and walking aids behind as testament to their healing.  The main wall at the entry into the basilica is completely covered with crutches.

In addition to the basilica, the town contains numerous religious edifices, the chief being the Scala Santa, built in imitation of the Holy Stairs in Rome.

The town is home of the Cyclorama of Jerusalem, a circular painting depicting the city of Jerusalem at the time of the death of Jesus.

Canyon Sainte-Anne, lying 6 km east of the town, is a steep walled gorge.  A  waterfall lies within the canyon.  The canyon is accessible to visitors via footpaths and foot bridges.

See also
 Charlevoix tourist train
 List of cities in Quebec

References

External links

Sainte-Anne-de-Beaupré on MSN Groups — group of discussion open to general public, featuring historic and contemporary photography.

Cities and towns in Quebec
Incorporated places in Capitale-Nationale